Zero sum is a situation in which a participant's gain or loss is exactly balanced by the losses or gains of the other participants.

Zero sum may also refer to:
 "Zero Sum" (The X-Files episode)
 Monthly Comic Zero Sum, a monthly shōjo manga published by Ichijinsha
 "Zero-Sum", a song by Nine Inch Nails from Year Zero
 Zero-sum problem
 Zero-sum thinking

See also
 Empty sum
 Non Zero Sumness
 Zerosumfree monoid